Conforming to Abnormality is Cephalic Carnage's first full-length album. It was first released in 1998 on Italy's Headfucker Records. In 2002, the album was re-released on Hybrid Records. In 2006, Subordinate Records from Italy re-released the album without the band's permission on CD and LP. In 2008, the album was remixed, remastered, and repackaged, and had 20 bonus tracks added. This version was released by Relapse Records on April 29, 2008. The bonus tracks come from the band's split with Anal Blast, plus a new song sung by former bassist Jawsh Mullen.

Track listing 

Tracks 9–28 are bonus tracks available on the 2008 re-release.

Personnel 
 Lenzig Leal – vocals
 Zac Joe – guitar, bass (1–8)
 John Merryman – drums
 Steve Goldberg – guitar, bass (1–8)
 Jawsh Mullen – bass (9–28)
 Brian Goldberg – vocals (16)

References

External links
 Cephalic Carnage on Myspace

1998 debut albums
Cephalic Carnage albums
Relapse Records albums